The Glaser-Dirks DG-100 is the first sailplane manufactured by Glaser-Dirks. It is a standard class glider designed by Wilhelm Dirks in 1974 and developed from the Akaflieg Darmstadt D-38.

Development
The first model had an all-flying tailplane, with anti-balance tabs along the entire trailing edges, and a two-piece canopy (movable and fixed parts), built of GFRP (glass-fibre reinforced plastic)/foam sandwich materials and resin impregnated rovings for high strength parts. Successive developments included the DG-100G, DG-101 and DG-101G.  Most models are available with water ballast bags in the wings.

The DG-101 and DG-101G had improvements such as a single-piece front-hinged canopy, improved crash resistant cockpit and a conventional tailplane (with fixed horizontal stabilizer and articulated elevator). There was also a club version of this sailplane with fixed landing gear. All models featured top-surface-only air brakes.

Some later models were also manufactured by the Elan company in Slovenia and can be identified by the word "ELAN" on the fuselage and rudder. The serial number of these gliders is prefixed with "E".

Although these gliders were designed in the 1970s, they are still popular in the Club class and remain competitive in Sports class contests (which are handicapped).

The wing's control surface hookups are non-automatic and utilize L'Hotellier fittings, which must be secured by a secondary means such as a safety pin, safety wire, Uerling Sleeve or Wedekind Sleeve (See this web page
for more details on this subject).

The Glaser-Dirks Company declared bankruptcy, after which the newly organized company DG Flugzeugbau GmbH assumed responsibility for servicing the gliders.

Variants
Akaflieg Darmstadt D-38
The prototype designed and built at Darmstadt University of Technology.
DG-100
The initial production version developed by Wilhelm Dirks.
DG-100G
Later production with a conventional tailplane and elevator in place of the all-flying tailplane.
DG-100 Club / Club DG
An unballasted, fixed gear version with a gross weight of 385 kg / 849 lb..
DG-101
The DG-101 introduced a one-piece full length canopy that opened forwards, but retaining the all-flying tail.
DG-101G
Ultimate production version with the one-piece canopy and the conventional tailplane with elevator.

Specifications (DG-100)

See also

References

Citations

Bibliography
Taylor, John W. R. Jane's All The World's Aircraft 1982–83. London: Jane's Yearbooks, 1982.

External links

Akaflieg Darmstadt website
DG-Flugzeugbau DG-100 Technical Notes
Johnson R, An Flight Test Evaluation of the DG-101G, Soaring, May 1985
Sailplane Directory

1970s German sailplanes
DG Flugzeugbau aircraft
T-tail aircraft
Aircraft first flown in 1974